Parlano MindAlign is a group chat software used as an alternate to email for large enterprises.  MindAlign is used most notably in the financial services industry.

Early history
The software was originally developed at UBS AG as an internal group chat solution. The product was sold to Parlano Inc, in the year 2000.

History and Acquisition 
Upon the acquisition of Parlano by Microsoft in 2007. Microsoft sold MindAlign 6 (the latest released version at that time) to Aditi Technologies Ltd in the same year. When Aditi acquired MindAlign in 2007, it inherited 56 of its customers, which included 5 of the top 7 global banks.

References 

Business chat software
UBS